Daviesia arenaria, commonly known as sandhill bitter-pea, is a species of flowering plant in the family Fabaceae and is endemic to south-eastern continental Australia. It is usually a hummock-forming shrub with many short, spiny branchlets and heart-shaped to elliptic phyllodes with a sharp point on the end, and orange-pink, maroon and yellow flowers.

Description

Taxonomy and naming
The specific epithet (arenaria) means "growing in sand".

Distribution and habitat
This species of pea mainly grows in mallee and is found in south-western New South Wales, western Victoria and south-eastern South Australia.

References

arenaria
Flora of New South Wales
Flora of Victoria (Australia)
Flora of South Australia
Plants described in 1980
Taxa named by Michael Crisp